Ojah Awake is an album by Ghanaian Afro rock band Osibisa released in 1976 by Island Records ILPS 9411. Issued in 1995 CD format by AIM Records (AIM 1056 CD).

Track listing

Personnel
 Teddy Osei – tenor and soprano saxophones, flute, African drums, vocals 
 Mac Tontoh – trumpet, flugelhorn, cabasa, bells, rattle, timbales 
 Sol Amarfio – drums, percussion, cowbells, bongos
 Kofi Ayivor - congas, percussion
 Kiki Gyan – organ, piano, clavinet, Moog synthesizer, vocals 
 Mike Odumusu – bass guitar, vocals
 Wendell Richardson – guitar, vocals
 Jake Solo – guitar on The Coffee Song and The Warrior, violin on Cherryfield
 Graham Smith – violin on Cherryfield, backing vocals

Credits
 Producer – Gerry Bron
 Assistant – Teddy Osei
 Engineer – Ashley Howe
 Assistants – John Gallen, Mark Deamley, Peter Gallen, Trevor Hallesy
 Recorded at the Roundhouse Recording Studios London, 1976 
 Photography and artwork concept – Graham Hughes

References

 All information gathered from back cover album Ojah Awake (Copyright © 1976 Island Records ILPS 9411.
 Allmusic  
 Discogs 

1976 albums
Osibisa albums
Albums produced by Gerry Bron
Bronze Records albums
Island Records albums